Lucky Summer is a residential neighbourhood in Nairobi's Kasarani area. It is a high-density suburb that hosts the low-income earners residents of Nairobi. It gives its name to an electoral ward with the same name.

Overview
Lucky Summer is one of the neighbourhoods electorally placed in Ruaraka Constituency, within the larger Kasarani Sub-county. It borders Dandora to the south. It is relatively a densely populated neighbourhood with rampant cases of insecurity and gang-related offences.

Facilities
The Mwangaza community library is a facility developed by KOSCOBAR, a Community-based Rehabilitation and Community Development project active in the slums of Nairobi. Owing to concerns over the possibility of burglary, the library is safeguarded by live-in security guard.

References

Suburbs of Nairobi